Antonio Zamperla S.p.A. is an Italian design and manufacturing company founded in 1966. It is best known for creating family rides, thrill rides and roller coasters worldwide. The company also makes smaller coin-operated rides commonly found inside shopping malls.

Zamperla builds roller coasters, like the powered Dragon Coaster, Mini Mouse, Zig Zag, and Volare. In 2006, Zamperla announced Motocoaster, a motorcycle-themed roller coaster. Rights to some of S.D.C.'s rides were handed to Zamperla (along with S&C and S&MC) after the company went bankrupt in 1993.

In 2005 the founder of the company, Mr. Antonio Zamperla, became the first Italian to be inducted into the IAAPA Hall of Fame by virtue of his significant contribution to the entire industry, joining other pioneers such as Walt Disney, George Ferris and Walter Knott.

Unlike companies such as Intamin, Vekoma, or Bolliger & Mabillard that concentrate on larger and faster roller coasters, Zamperla focuses on more family-friendly roller coasters that can be easily mass-produced, taken down, and transported to different locations. They are also a major manufacturer of flat rides with such names as: Balloon Race, Bumper cars, Disk'O, Ferris wheel, Water Flume Ride, Galleon/Swinging Ship, Sky Drop, Discovery, Windshear, Tornado, Energy Storm, Z-Force, Mixer, Rotoshake, Turbo Force, Power Surge, Mini Jet, and Air Race.

Company structure 
The company is organized in different departments, the Art Department that works on the study and creation of different themings of the rides, the Technical Department that designs the engineering of the attractions, the Production Department that handles their realization, the Sales Department, the Customer Care and the Park Development Department that works on the design and creation of an amusement park.

Projects 

In 2010 Antonio Zamperla S.p.A. was selected by CAI (Central Amusement International) to restore and renovate the Coney Island area in New York City. The company managed Coney Island's Luna Park and installed only Zamperla rides, representing a perfect test bed for new attractions before to launch them.

From 2003 to 2019, Zamperla transformed the Trump Organization's Wollman Rink, within New York City's Central Park, into Victorian Gardens, a traditional-style amusement park with rides like the "Family Swinger", "Samba Balloon", "Aeromax", "Convoy", "Rocking Tug", "Kite Flyer". The park closed in 2021 due to the COVID-19 pandemic.

Another famous Zamperla project is Kernwasser, north of Düsseldorf, a former nuclear power station that was turned into an amusement park called Wunderland Kalkar.

Gallery

List of roller coasters

As of 2022, Zamperla has built 368 roller coasters around the world.

List of other attractions

References

External links

 
Amusement ride manufacturers
Manufacturing companies of Italy
Roller coaster designers
Roller coaster manufacturers
Manufacturing companies established in 1966
Italian companies established in 1966
Italian brands
Companies based in Vicenza
Articles containing video clips